Akaisphecia is a genus of moths in the family Sesiidae.

Species
 Akaisphecia melanopuncta Gorbunov & Arita, 1995 – Vietnam

References

Sesiidae